Aslanbek Shymbergenov (born 9 October 1993) is an Kazakhstani boxer. He won the silver medal in the men's 69 kg event at the 2018 Asian Games.

In 2019, at the Military World Games held in Wuhan, China, he won the gold medal in the men's 69 kg event.

References

External links 
 

Living people
1993 births
Place of birth missing (living people)
Kazakhstani male boxers
Asian Games medalists in boxing
Asian Games silver medalists for Kazakhstan
Boxers at the 2018 Asian Games
Medalists at the 2018 Asian Games
Welterweight boxers
21st-century Kazakhstani people